Deštná is a town in Jindřichův Hradec District in the South Bohemian Region of the Czech Republic. It has about 700 inhabitants.

Administrative parts
The village of Lipovka is an administrative part of Deštná.

Notable people
Carl Ditters von Dittersdorf (1739–1799), Austrian composer, violinist and silvologist; buried here
Bohumil Jílek (1892–1963), politician

References

External links

Populated places in Jindřichův Hradec District
Cities and towns in the Czech Republic